Reinas de Costa Rica is a national beauty pageant in Costa Rica that selects representatives to the Miss World and Miss International pageant. After the Miss Costa Rica pageant stopped sending contestants to the Miss World and Miss International pageants in 2006, the franchise was acquired by the Reinas de Costa Rica organization presided by Alan Aleman. However, after two years of absence in the Miss World pageant in 2017-2018, the organization eventually lost the franchise to the newly established contest, in 2019. The organization also lost the Miss Earth franchise to Jose Vásconez in 2016.

This pageant is unrelated to the Miss Costa Rica Organization.

Representatives at Big Four pageants
The following women have represented Costa Rica in three of the Big Four major international beauty pageants for women. These are Miss World, Miss International, and Miss Earth with the exception of Miss Universe which has its own national franchise in Costa Rica.
Color key

Representatives at Miss World
On occasion, when the candidate does not qualify (due to age) for either contest, another girl is sent.

In 2005, Costa Rica was crowned as Miss Asia Pacific International 2005. She withdrew the title and competed at the Miss World pageant. This is the first time Costa Rica withdrew the title as the reigning queen.

Representatives at Miss International
Before joining to Reinas de Costa Rica, the 1st runner-up or Winner of Miss Costa Rica represented her country at the Miss International pageant. On occasion, when the candidate does not qualify (due to age) for either contest, another girl is sent. As of 2003, Committee Miss Costa Rica has created a separate pageant called "Reinas de Costa Rica" to select its representative for Miss International 2003.

Representatives at Miss Earth
During 2007 - 2015, the Costa Rica representatives at Miss Earth were send by Reinas de Costa Rica. After the absence in 2016, a Costa Rican producer Jose Vásconez acquired the franchise and run the pageant separately to select the country representatives for Miss Earth. Vásconez also serves as the national director of Miss Intercontinental Costa Rica.

References

Costa Rica
Costa Rica
Recurring events established in 1965
Costa Rican awards